Arrigo Equini was an Italian art director who designed the sets of around eighty films during his career.

Selected filmography
 The Black Eagle (1946)
 The White Devil (1947)
 Ring Around the Clock (1950)
 The Captain of Venice (1951)
 I'm the Capataz (1951)
 Beatrice Cenci (1956)
 Cleopatra's Daughter (1960)
 The Pharaohs' Woman (1960)
 The 300 Spartans (1962)
 War of the Trojans (1962)
 Cast a Giant Shadow (1966)
 Buona Sera, Mrs. Campbell (1968)
 Hornets' Nest (1970)
 The Assassination of Trotsky (1972)
 Massacre in Rome (1973)

References

Bibliography
 James Palmer, Michael Riley. The Films of Joseph Losey. Cambridge University Press, 1993.

External links

Year of birth unknown
Year of death unknown
Italian art directors